Last Man Standing may refer to:

Film 
 Last Man Standing (1987 film), a film directed by Damian Lee
 Last Man Standing (1996 film), a film starring Bruce Willis
 Undisputed II: Last Man Standing, a 2006 sequel to the action film Undisputed

Literature 
 Last Man Standing (novel), a novel by David Baldacci
 Last Man Standing: Killbook of a Bounty Hunter, a graphic novel series
 Last Man Standing, a biography of Jamie Dimon, by Duff McDonald

Music

Albums 
 Last Man Standing (E-type album), 1998
 Last Man Standing (Jerry Lee Lewis album), 2006
 Last Man Standing Live, by Jerry Lee Lewis
 Last Man Standing (MC Eiht album), 1997
 Last Man Standing (Ryan Shupe & The RubberBand album)
 Last Man Standing (Willie Nelson album), 2018
 Last Man Standing, by Mr. Capone-E
 Last Man Standing, by RBL Posse member Black C

Songs 
 "Last Man Standing" (Pop Evil song), 2010
 "Last Man Standing" (Some & Any song), 2009
 "Last Man Standing", by Asher Roth & Akon from the Madden NFL 12 video game soundtrack
 "Last Man Standing", by Bon Jovi from Have a Nice Day
 "Last Man Standing", by Duran Duran from Red Carpet Massacre
 "Last Man Standing", by Eric Martin for Pride FC
 "Last Man Standing", by HammerFall from Steel Meets Steel: Ten Years of Glory
 "Last Man Standing", by Hybrid from I Choose Noise
"Last Man Standing", by Kompany and Virus Syndicate from Metropolis
 "Last Man Standing", by People in Planes from Beyond the Horizon
 "Last Man Standing", by Satyricon from The Age of Nero
 "Last Man Standing", by Victoria Justice, 2023

Television 
 Last Man Standing (Australian TV series), a 2005 drama series
 Last Man Standing (British TV series), a 2007–2008 reality series
 Last Man Standing (American TV series), a 2011–2017, 2018-2021 sitcom starring Tim Allen and Nancy Travis
 Making the Cut: Last Man Standing, a Canadian reality television series featuring ice hockey
 Last Man Standing: Politics, Texas Style, a 2004 documentary film aired as an installment of the TV series POV

Episodes 
 "Last Man Standing" (1 vs. 100)
 "Last Man Standing" (The Biggest Loser Asia)
 "Last Man Standing" (Casualty)
 "The Last Man Standing" (Cosby)
 "Last Man Standing" (Desire)
 "Last Man Standing" (I'm Alive)
 "Last Man Standing" (Jake 2.0)
 "Last Man Standing" (Love Games: Bad Girls Need Love Too)
 "Last Man Standing" (NCIS)
 "Last Man Standing" (NY Ink)
 "Last Man Standing" (The Naked Archaeologist)
 "Last Man Standing" (The Net)
 "Last Man Standing" (A Scare at Bedtime)
 "Last Man Standing" (She Spies)
 "Last Man Standing" (Solved)
 "Last Man Standing", an episode of City Homicide

Video games 
 Last man standing (gaming), a gametype featured in several computer and video games
 Last Man Standing Coop, a Doom 3 cooperative-play modification

Other 
 Last Man Standing (motorcycle race), an annual event in Bulcher, Texas, US
 Last Man Standing match, a type of specialty match in professional wrestling

See also 
 The Last Women Standing, 2015 romantic drama film
 Last One Standing (disambiguation)
 The Last Man (disambiguation)